The 1954 NCAA Division I men's ice hockey tournament was the culmination of the 1953–54 NCAA men's ice hockey season, the 7th such tournament in NCAA history. It was held between March 11 and 13, 1954, and concluded with Rensselaer defeating Minnesota 5-4 in overtime. All games were played at the Broadmoor Ice Palace in Colorado Springs, Colorado.

This was the first championship game to go into overtime.

Rensselaer's title was the only championship won by a team from the Tri-State League. Despite its low membership the Tri-State League would send at least one representative to the tournament every year from 1952 through 1964 before being dissolved in 1972.

Minnesota's victory in the semifinal over Boston College holds two separate records: the most goals scored by one team in an NCAA tournament game (14, tied with Michigan in 1953) and the largest single-game margin of victory in an NCAA tournament (+13).

Boston College, by being outscored 3-21 in their two games, also holds the worst single-tournament goal differential (-18). (as of 2016)

Qualifying teams
Four teams qualified for the tournament, two each from the eastern and western regions. The two best WIHL teams and a Tri-State League representative received bids into the tournament as did one independent school.

Format
The eastern team judged as better was seeded as the top eastern team while the WIHL champion was given the top western seed. The second eastern seed was slotted to play the top western seed and vice versa. All games were played at the Broadmoor Ice Palace. All matches were Single-game eliminations with the semifinal winners advancing to the national championship game and the losers playing in a consolation game.

Bracket

Note: * denotes overtime period(s)

Results

Semifinals

Minnesota vs. Boston College

Michigan vs. Rensselaer

Consolation Game

Michigan vs. Boston College

National Championship

(W2) Minnesota vs. (E2) Rensselaer

All-Tournament team

First team
G: Bob Fox (Rensselaer)
D: Jim Pope (Rensselaer)
D: Ken Yackel (Minnesota)
F: Frank Chiarelli (Rensselaer)
F: John Mayasich (Minnesota)
F: Gordie Peterkin (Rensselaer)
* Most Outstanding Player(s)

Second team
G: Jim Mattson (Minnesota)
D: Jim Haas (Michigan)
D: Bob Siblo (Boston College)
F: Abbie Moore* (Rensselaer)
F: Bill MacFarland (Michigan)
F: Dick Dougherty (Minnesota)

References

Tournament
NCAA Division I men's ice hockey tournament
NCAA Men's Ice Hockey Tournament
NCAA Men's Ice Hockey Tournament
1950s in Colorado Springs, Colorado
Ice hockey competitions in Colorado Springs, Colorado